7,8,3′-Trihydroxyflavone (7,8,3'-THF) is a flavone and small-molecule agonist of TrkB, the main receptor of brain-derived neurotrophic factor (BDNF), that was derived from tropoflavin (7,8-DHF). Relative to tropoflavin, 7,8,3'-THF is 2–3-fold more potent in vitro as a TrkB agonist. 7,3’-Dihydroxyflavone (7,3'-DHF) is also more potent than tropoflavin in vitro, indicating that a 3'-hydroxy group on the B-ring enhances TrkB agonistic activity. 7,8,3'-THF has been tested in vivo and was found to produce TrkB-dependent neuroprotective effects in mice similarly to tropoflavin.

See also 
 Tropomyosin receptor kinase B § Agonists

References 

Flavones
Neuroprotective agents
TrkB agonists